Kun Sorkh (also Romanized as Kūn Sorkh; also known as Kon-e Sorkh and Kon Sorkh) is a village in Sadat Rural District, in the Central District of Lali County, Khuzestan Province, Iran. At the 2006 census, its population was 46, in 7 families.

References 

Populated places in Lali County